In quantum group and Hopf algebra, the bicrossed product is a process to create new Hopf algebras from the given ones. It's motivated by the Zappa–Szép product of groups. It was first discussed by M. Takeuchi in 1981, and now a general tool for construction of Drinfeld quantum double.

Bicrossed product 

Here the Sweedler's notation of coproduct of Hopf algebra is used.

Drinfeld quantum double 

In this case, the bicrossed product of them is called Drinfeld quantum double .

References 

Hopf algebras